Imam Mohamad Jawad Chirri (October 1, 1905 – November 10, 1994) was the founder and  director of the Islamic Center of America until his death.

Books authored
In addition to writing The Shi'ites Under Attack:

Books about Islamic jurisprudence and its basis:
 Al-Riyad in the Basis of Jurisprudence
 Al-Taharah (the purity)
 Fasting
 The Book of Prayer
 The Islamic Wills-

A book about the caliphate:

 The Caliphate in the Islamic Constitution.

Books in English about Islam:

 Muslim  Practice
 The Faith of Islam
 Inquiries About Islam
 Imam Hussein, Leader of the Martyrs
 The Brother of the Prophet Muhammad (the Imam Ali). (He also wrote this book in Arabic and named it Amir al-Mu'minin)

Mission 
Imam Chirri’s goal was to spread Islam in a country that had not known it and to a community that he felt was starving for it. The sizable Muslim community in the Dearborn/Detroit metro area can serve as an example of his influence. His foundation provided security for those that were thinking of immigrating to North America and the influx of immigrants influenced the foundation of several other Islamic institutions to act similarly, allowing many other Muslim clergy to immigrate to the Americas.

The new Islamic Center of America on Ford Road opened its doors in 2005 and marked the 10th anniversary of the passing of the late Imam.

Biography 
Imam Mohamad Jawad Chirri was born in Lebanon to a Shi’a Muslim family. He was a graduate of the theological seminary of Najaf in Iraq. He then traveled to the United States of America in 1948 at the request of the then small Muslim community in the Detroit area to "...bring guidance and purpose". The community then was made up of mostly Lebanese immigrants from as early as the turn of the 20th Century and their first- and second-generation offspring. Imam Chirri was able to transform a community that had lived and almost assimilated into a Christian culture into a community that found solidarity under the Islamic Center Foundation Society in Highland Park, Michigan.

Building the Islamic Center of Detroit  
In 1959, Imam Mohamad Jawad Chirri traveled to the United Arab Republic (Egypt)  to meet with President Gamal Abdel Nasser to seek financial assistance in building a new mosque in America. Imam Chirri also took the opportunity to meet with Imam Mahmud Shaltut of the Al-Azhar University to discuss similarities between the Sunni and Twelvers Shi’a schools of thought. After the dialogues, Imam Shaltout made an announcement that the Sunni and Shi’a sects are both sound schools of thought, and they both share equal legitimacy in Islam. Imam Chirri was also able to convince President Nasser to help his foundation purchase a parcel of land on Joy Road and Greenfield. With further community donations, three years after his trip to Egypt, the Islamic Center of Detroit (which would later be renamed the Islamic Center of America) opened its doors in 1962.

See also
 History of the Middle Eastern people in Metro Detroit

References

External links
Various works in English by Shaykh Muhammad Jawad Chirri
Islamic Center of America

American imams
Lebanese imams
20th-century imams
1905 births
1994 deaths
American Shia Muslims
Lebanese Shia Muslims
Lebanese emigrants to the United States
Place of birth missing